Doug Hocking (born October 16, 1969 in Sarnia, Ontario) was a star linebacker who played twelve seasons in the CFL for the BC Lions and the Winnipeg Blue Bombers.

High school and college career
Hocking played four seasons in the Canadian Junior Football League for the Surrey Rams.

Canadian Football League career
Hocking would play 12 years with the BC Lions and Winnipeg Blue Bombers, from 1991 to 2002.

Post-playing career
He was the football coach of the Winnipeg Rifles of the CJFL for the 2003 season. He then moved on to be the defensive coordinator of the Vancouver Island Raiders, a position he held until the end of the 2011 season. For the 2012 season, he joined the coaching staff of the UBC Thunderbirds, under defensive co-ordinator Jerome Erdman and head coach Shawn Olson.

References
Career Bio
Coaching Bio

1969 births
BC Lions players
Canadian football linebackers
Living people
Sportspeople from Sarnia
Players of Canadian football from Ontario
Winnipeg Blue Bombers players